Litton is a civil parish in the Derbyshire Dales district of Derbyshire, England.  The parish contains 27 listed buildings that are recorded in the National Heritage List for England.  Of these, one is listed at Grade II*, the middle of the three grades, and the others are at Grade II, the lowest grade.  The parish contains the villages of Litton and Cressbrook and the surrounding area.  The listed buildings in Litton are grouped around the village green, and include houses, cottages, farmhouses and a barn, a public house, a school, and a village cross.  The listed buildings in Cressbrook are mainly associated with the former cotton mill, Cressbrook Mill, which is listed, together with Cressbrook Hall and its lodges, which were built for the owner, workers' cottages, a former apprentices' house, a war memorial, and a telephone kiosk.  Between the villages, in an otherwise isolated position, are two terraces of workers' cottages.


Key

Buildings

References

Citations

Sources

 

Lists of listed buildings in Derbyshire